Joseph Robinson (ca. 1742 – August 24, 1807) was an American-born lawyer, judge and political figure on Prince Edward Island. He served in the Legislative Assembly of Prince Edward Island from 1790 to 1794.

He was born in the Province of Virginia and later moved to South Carolina. He was a major and later lieutenant-colonel in the Loyalist militia during the American Revolutionary War and fought at the Battle of Ninety-Six Court-House in 1775. At the end of the war, he first settled in Jamaica, then New Brunswick and finally went to St John's Island (later renamed Prince Edward Island), in 1789 at the invitation of governor Edmund Fanning. In 1790, he was named an assistant judge in the Supreme Court. In the same year, he was elected to the assembly. He served as speaker from 1790 to 1794, when he resigned his seat after being named to the Legislative Council of Prince Edward Island. In 1796, he published the pamphlet To the farmers in the Island of St. John, in the Gulf of St. Lawrence, which raised the issue of absentee landlords who failed to pay their quit rents. In 1797, Robinson resigned his seat on the bench to become a practising attorney. He died in Charlottetown in 1807.

References

Speakers of the Legislative Assembly of Prince Edward Island
Members of the Legislative Council of Prince Edward Island
Judges in Prince Edward Island
1807 deaths
Year of birth uncertain
United Empire Loyalists
Colony of Prince Edward Island judges